Uzun Owbeh (also Romanized as Ūzūn Owbeh; also known as Ūzon Owbeh) is a village in Marhemetabad-e Shomali Rural District, Marhemetabad District, Miandoab County, West Azerbaijan Province, Iran. At the 2006 census, its population was 788, in 173 families.

References 

Populated places in Miandoab County